The New Democratic Party won thirteen seats in the 2000 federal election, emerging as the fourth-largest party in the House of Commons of Canada. Many of the party's candidates have their own biography pages; information on others may be found here.

Quebec

Raymond Dorion (Bas-Richelieu—Nicolet—Bécancour)

Raymond Dorion listed himself as self-employed.  He received 421 votes (0.95%), finishing sixth against Bloc Québécois incumbent Louis Plamondon.

Jeff Itcush (Brome—Missisquoi)
Jeff Itcush was born and raised in Regina, Saskatchewan. He moved to Montreal in 1989 and has taught history and social studies at Bialik High School since 1994. He is a past president of the Federation of Teachers of Jewish Schools and has worked as a chief negotiator in representing teachers. He has also served on the boards of the Quebec Jewish Congress and the Canadian Jewish Congress. In 2010, he was quoted in Le Devoir commenting on values common to the Quebec Jewish community and Quebec society as a whole.

He is a vocal supporter of Israel. In 2005, he delivered a speech at the Cummings Jewish Centre for Seniors entitled "Israel - Beacon to the World - Promoting a Democratic State in 2005." Later in the same year, he delivered public lectures entitled "Israel - Canada: Common Values, Distinct Identities" and "Israel: A Society in Flux."

Itcush has been quoted in a number of publications on issues ranging from governance to labor relations to intercultural relations.

Itcush joined the New Democratic Party in the mid-1990s and has served on the party's federal council and Quebec executive. He was a party candidate in the 1997 and 2000 federal elections; the party was in a weak state in Quebec during this period, and Itcush has acknowledged that he only ran to ensure his party had a candidate on the ballot. At the municipal level, he was initially an organizer for the Montreal Island Citizens Union but later left that party to join Projet Montréal, for which he ran in the 2005 municipal election.

He has been nominated as the New Democratic Party's candidate for Mount Royal in the 2011 federal election. Jack Layton and Thomas Mulcair spoke at his nomination.

Milan Mirich (Hochelaga—Maisonneuve)
Milan Mirich was born in Yugoslavia and has worked as a restaurateur. He has been a candidate in two federal and three provincial elections. In his first campaign, he supported a shorter work week as a means of increasing employment. There was a candidate name Milan Mirich in the 2005 and 2009 Montreal municipal elections; it is assumed this is the same person.

Ontario

Simon Rowland (Eglinton—Lawrence)

Rowland was the New Democratic Party's youngest candidate in 2000, at only 19 years of age.  He attended university at age sixteen, helped found Youth for Socialist Action, and became a successful e-business entrepreneur.  Rowland acknowledged that he was halfway to being a millionaire in 2000, but commented "Just because I've been able to make the system work for me does not mean that the system works for everyone".  He added that he wanted to make a difference for working Canadians.  He received 2,663 votes (6.42%), finishing fourth against Liberal incumbent Joe Volpe.  Rowland remains active in the technological sector .

Karen Dolan (Etobicoke Centre)
Dolan was born in England, and moved to Canada in 1963. She has a diploma in advertising, and is also a graduate of the Ontario Labour College. She began working for Stelco in 1979, and became an employee at General Motors in Oshawa in 1984. Strongly involved in union activities, Dolan was a member of the woman's committee and educational trainer for Canadian Auto Workers Local 222 in Oshawa. She campaigned for the NDP in both the 1997 and 2000 federal elections.

She contested the 1997 campaign in Whitby—Ajax, at age thirty-six (Toronto Star, 24 May 1997). She received 3,354 votes (6.79%), finishing fourth against Liberal candidate Judi Longfield.

Dolan later challenged high-profile Liberal cabinet minister Allan Rock in the 2000 election. She lived in Ottawa at the time, and was only able to campaign on a part-time basis in Rock's Toronto riding. Acknowledging that her campaign did not have a strong presence, she said she was "simply doing her part for the party" (Toronto Star, 24 November 2000). She received 2,124 votes, finishing fourth against Rock.

As of 1997, a Karen Dolan worked as a union rep, director of organizing, and other capacities for Service Employees International Union. As of the summer of 2007, Karen Dolan, is now Director of Labour Relations, for (Chartwell Senior Housing Reit).

Theresa Kiefer (Lanark—Carleton)
Kiefer was born in Edmonton, Alberta. She holds a Bachelor of Applied Science degree in Communications from Simon Fraser University, and a Master of Arts degree in Social and Political Thought from York University. After graduating, Kiefer worked as a teacher. While living in British Columbia in the 1980s, she was a member of Concerned Citizens for Choice on Abortion.

She received 1,946 votes (3.07%), finishing fourth against Canadian Alliance candidate Scott Reid.

, Kiefer works as president of the NDP political staff union at the House of Commons of Canada. Early in 2005, she spearheaded a successful drive to give her union affiliate status as the Communications, Energy and Paperworkers' Union of Canada, Local 232 (Hill Times, 10–16 January 2005).

Craig Parsons (Nepean—Carleton)
Parsons holds a university degree in Political Science from Carleton University, and was a restaurant manager at the time of the 2000 campaign. He had previously campaigned for the New Democratic Party of Ontario in 1999. A canvasser for Friends of the Wolf and other environmental groups, Parsons received endorsements from local environmental groups during his provincial campaign (Ottawa Citizen, 4 June 1999). He was 30 years old in 1999 (Ottawa Citizen, 27 May 1999).

He initially sought the Ottawa West—Nepean NDP nomination for the 1999 election, but lost to Alex Cullen (Ottawa Citizen, 5 October 1998 and 7 January 1999).

Paul Chislett (Sudbury)

Chislett was raised in a low-income family in Sudbury, and later became a labour leader in that city.  He worked in telephone repair for Bell Canada, and was president of the Energy and Paperworkers Union Local 37 in the 1990s and 2000s (decade).  He criticized the changes taking place in the telephone industry, noting that call centres were creating lower-wage jobs in the industry.  Chislett also wrote pieces that criticized modern economic globalism, and called for urban planning in Sudbury to be based on citizen's needs.  At his nomination meeting in 2000, Chislett endorsed the social democratic idea of wealth distribution.

Chislett called for Sudbury workers to take actions toward a general strike in November 2000, in protest against the labour policies of provincial government of Mike Harris.  He holds liberal views on social issues, and criticized Nickel Belt Member of Parliament (MP) Ray Bonin in 2003 for opposing same-sex marriage.

He ran for Mel Hurtig's short-lived National Party in 1993, and has since been a New Democratic Party candidate at the provincial and federal levels.

Chislett moved to Windsor in 2007, to take Communication Studies courses at the University of Windsor.  He has written for the Windsor Star, and operates a blog.

Allan Douglas Strong (Waterloo—Wellington)
Strong received 1,845 votes (4.11%), finishing fourth against Liberal Lynn Myers. He later joined the Green Party.

Vic Perroni (Whitby—Ajax)
Perroni was educated at the University of Messina School of Law in Italy, and at the University of Toronto. Formerly a credit union manager and a factory worker, he was retired by the time of the 2000 election. Perroni was a founding member of the New Democratic Party in 1960, and was active in the labour movement for several years with the IWA and the Ontario Federation of Labour. He has noted, with some pride, that his local was the first to affiliate with the NDP. He was 62 years old in 2000 (Toronto Star, 23 November 2000).

He received 2,359 votes (4.84%), finishing fourth against Liberal incumbent Judy Longfield.

Manitoba

Errol Black (Brandon—Souris)

Black received 4,518 votes (12.33%), finishing fourth against Progressive Conservative incumbent Rick Borotsik.

Diane Beresford (Portage—Lisgar)
Beresford is a former vice-president and president of the Manitoba Teachers' Federation. Her parents met at a Young Communist meeting in Britain during World War II, and she was raised in a culture of socialism and union activism (Winnipeg Free Press, 25 June 1998). She has taught high-school English in the Manitoba system at Notre Dame de Lourdes (Winnipeg Free Press, 4 December 1993), and was a frequent critic of the Progressive Conservative government of Manitoba's education policies in the 1990s. In 1998, she dismissed charter schools as an "imported education fad" that fails to address the problem of funding (Winnipeg Free Press, 21 April 1998).

She campaigned as a candidate of the New Democratic Party of Manitoba in the 1999 provincial election, and finished third against Progressive Conservative candidate Denis Rocan in the rural constituency of Carman.

She received 2,073 votes (6.02%) in the 2000 election, finishing fifth against Canadian Alliance candidate Brian Pallister.

Beresford has remained active in the Manitoba Teachers' Society, and was listed as its staff officer in May 2005. She was also a board member of Manitoba's Crocus Investment Fund, and was sued in 2005 after questions were raised about its valuation (Winnipeg Free Press, 13 July 2005). The matter has not yet been resolved.

Peter Hiebert (Provencher)
Hiebert is a frequent candidate for the New Democratic Party at the provincial and federal levels. He is a retired pipe welder, and has also done development work in India and Upper Volta as a representative of the Mennonite Central Committee. In 1982, he was appointed to the board of directors for the Overseas Book Centre (Globe and Mail, 2 January 1982). In 1996, he spoke before a provincial committee against the Gary Filmon government's decision to privatize the Manitoba Telephone System.

Hiebert was sixty-six years old in 2000. A Winnipeg Free Press article from the election describes him as "an animated speaker and staunch New Democrat". He acknowledged that he had little chance of winning, and operated a low-budget campaign (Winnipeg Free Press, 23 November 2000). He finished fourth against Canadian Alliance candidate Vic Toews.

Hiebert protested against the invasion of Iraq in 2003 (WFP, 19 January 2003).

Roman Yereniuk (Winnipeg North—St. Paul)

Yereniuk received 7,931 votes, finishing third against Liberal incumbent Rey Pagtakhan.

Saskatchewan

Hugh Walker (Saskatoon—Wanuskewin)

Walker is an economic consultant, with a PhD in agricultural economics.  He has worked for organizations such as the Agricultural Economics Research Council of Canada, the Canadian Livestock Feed Board and Western Economic Diversification in Saskatoon.  A longtime party member, he served as president of the provincial Saskatoon Northwest NDP constituency organization from 1993 to 1997 (Saskatoon Star-Phoenix, 8 September 2000).  Much of his campaign focused on economic issues.  He received 8,022 votes (24.23%), finishing second against Canadian Alliance incumbent Maurice Vellacott.

Alberta

Richard D. Vanderberg (Edmonton West)
Vanderberg (born November 12, 1940, in Scottsbluff, Nebraska) was a university professor. He held a Bachelor of Economics degree from the University of Wyoming, a Master's Degree in Economics from the University of Wisconsin–Madison, a Master of Arts degree in Philosophy from the University of Southampton, and a PhD in Political Science from the University of Calgary. He came to Canada from England in 1969, and held dual Canadian-American citizenship. He has taught political studies at the University of Calgary and the University of Saskatchewan (Calgary Herald, 20 January 1989), and was once an associate professor of Political Science and Economics at the University of Alberta. Since the 1990s, he had taught at Grant MacEwan Community College (Edmonton Journal, 5 March 1997).

Vanderberg ran the Wyoming headquarters for John F. Kennedy's campaign during the 1960 American presidential election. He had campaigned four times for the provincial and federal wings of the New Democratic Party. In 1995, he co-chaired a loose coalition of groups called the Alberta Common Front to protest cutbacks by the provincial government of Ralph Klein.

Following the 1988 election, Vanderberg called for the NDP to consider reducing its alliance with central Canadian unions (Calgary Herald, 8 December 1988). In the 1997 campaign, he argued that federal MPs should be put on a civil service pension rather than being allowed to determine their own pension plans (Edmonton Journal, 29 May 1997).

He was a member of the Royal Astronomical Society of Canada, including the positions of the president of its Halifax and Edmonton Chapters.

After he retired from teaching in the late 2000s, he moved to Halifax, NS to be closer to family. He died from cancer in Halifax on July 27, 2012.

References